Jeremy Michael Ward (May 5, 1976 – May 25, 2003) was an American musician, best known as the sound technician and vocal operator for The Mars Volta and De Facto.

Biography 
Jeremy Ward was born in Fort Worth, Texas and later moved to El Paso. He was a cousin of Jim Ward and was loosely associated with Jim's band At the Drive-In since its formation in 1994. After that band split for the first time in 2001, members Cedric Bixler-Zavala and Omar Rodríguez-López invited Ward to contribute vocals and electronic effects to their interim project De Facto, and then their more permanent band The Mars Volta. He contributed to that group's debut album De-Loused in the Comatorium, and his experimental sound manipulations have been cited as integral to that album's sound.

Less than a month before the album was released, Ward was found dead of an apparent heroin overdose on May 25, 2003. Bixler-Zavala and Rodríguez-López have stated that Ward's death inspired them to kick their own addictions. Ward had also worked as a repo man, and an anonymous diary that he had found while repossessing a car became the basis for the lyrics in the next Mars Volta album, Frances the Mute. Some of Ward's experimental recordings were used posthumously on later albums by The Mars Volta and Omar Rodríguez-López, and Lopez created the full-length album Omar Rodriguez Lopez & Jeremy Michael Ward from such compositions in 2008.

Discography

With At the Drive-In 
 In/Casino/Out (1998)

With De Facto 
 How Do You Dub? You Fight For Dub, You Plug Dub In (1999/2001)
 456132015 (2001)
 Megaton Shotblast (2001)
 Légende du Scorpion à Quatre Queues (2001)

With The Mars Volta 
 Tremulant (2002)
 De-Loused in the Comatorium (2003)
 Octahedron (2009)

With Omar Rodríguez-López 
 A Manual Dexterity: Soundtrack Volume 1 (2004)
 Omar Rodriguez Lopez & Jeremy Michael Ward (2008)
 Minor Cuts and Scrapes in the Bushes Ahead (2008)
 Telesterion (2011)

Equipment

With De Facto 
 Yamaha QY100
 Electro-Harmonix Frequency Analyzer
 Digitech Multi chorus
 Guyatone MD-3 Digital delay
 Ibanez DE-7 delay/Echo
 Boss DD-6 delay
 Boss HR-2 Harmonist
 Maxon Rotary phaser
 Korg KP2 Kaoss pad
 Voodoo Lab Pedal Power

References 

1976 births
2003 deaths
Deaths by heroin overdose in California
20th-century American guitarists
Guitarists from Texas
American male guitarists
The Mars Volta members
20th-century American male musicians
De Facto (band) members